Glutamate receptor 3 is a protein that in humans is encoded by the GRIA3 gene.

Function 

Glutamate receptors are the predominant excitatory neurotransmitter receptors in the mammalian brain and are activated in a variety of normal neurophysiologic processes. These receptors are heteromeric protein complexes with multiple subunits, each possessing transmembrane regions, and all arranged to form a ligand-gated ion channel. The classification of glutamate receptors is based on their activation by different pharmacologic agonists. This gene belongs to a family of alpha-amino-3-hydroxy-5-methyl-4-isoxazole propionate (AMPA) receptors. Alternative splicing at this locus results in several different isoforms which may vary in their signal transduction properties.

Genome studies have uncovered a tentative link between defective GRIA3 variants and a highly elevated risk of schizophrenia.

Interactions
GRIA3 has been shown to interact with GRIP1 and PICK1.

RNA editing
Several ion channels and neurotransmitters receptors pre-mRNA as substrates for ADARs. This includes 5 subunits of the glutamate receptor: ionotropic AMPA glutamate receptor subunits (Glur2, Glur3, Glur4) and kainate receptor subunits (Glur5, Glur6). Glutamate gated ion channels are made up of four subunits per channel with each subunit contributing to the pore loop structure. The pore loop structure is related to that found in K+ channels (e.g., human Kv1.1 channel). The human Kv1.1 channel pre mRNA is also subject to A to I RNA editing. The function of the glutamate receptors  is in the mediation of fast neurotransmission to the brain. The diversity of the subunits is determined, as well as rna splicing by RNA editing events of the individual subunits. This give rise to the necessarily high diversity of these receptors. GluR3 is a gene product of the GRIA3 gene and its pre-mRNA is subject to RNA editing.

Type 
A to I RNA editing is catalyzed by a family of adenosine deaminases acting on RNA (ADARs) that specifically recognize adenosines within double-stranded regions of pre-mRNAs and deaminate them to inosine. Inosines are recognised as guanosine by the cells translational machinery. There are three members of the ADAR family ADARs 1-3, with ADAR1 and ADAR2 being the only enzymatically active members. ADAR3 is thought to have a regulatory role in the brain. ADAR1 and ADAR2 are widely expressed in tissues while ADAR3 is restricted to the brain. The double-stranded regions of RNA are formed by base-pairing between residues in the close to region of the editing site with residues usually in a neighboring intron but can be an exonic sequence. The region that base pairs with the editing region is known as an Editing Complementary Sequence (ECS)

Location 
The pre-mRNA of this subunit is edited at one position. The R/G editing site is located in exon 13 between the M3 and M4 regions. Editing results in a codon change from an arginine (AGA) to a glycine (GGA). The location of editing corresponds to a bipartite ligand interaction domain of the receptor. The R/G site is found at amino acid 769 immediately before the 38-amino-acid-long flip and flop modules introduced by alternative splicing. Flip and Flop forms are present in both edited and nonedited versions of this protein. The editing complementary sequence (ECS) is found in an intronic sequence close to the exon. The intronic sequence includes a 5' splice site. The predicted double stranded region is 30 base pairs in length. The adenosine residue is mismatched in genomically encoded transcript, however this is not the case following editing. Despite similar sequences to the Q/R site of GluR-B, editing at this site does not occur in GluR-3 pre-mRNA.  Editing results in the targeted adenosine, which is mismatched prior to editing in the double-stranded RNA structure to become matched after editing. The intronic sequence involved contains a 5' donor splice site.

Conservation 
Editing also occurs in rat.

Regulation 
Editing of GluR-3 is regulated in rat brain from low levels in embryonic stage to a large increase in editing levels at birth.  In humans, 80-90% of GRIA3 transcripts are edited. The absence of the Q/R site editing in this glutamate receptor subunit is due to the absence of necessary intronic sequence required to form a duplex.

Consequences

Structure 

Editing results in a codon change  from (AGA) to (GGA), an R to a G change at the editing site.

Function 

Editing at R/G site allows for faster recovery from desensitisation. Unedited Glu-R at this site  have slower recovery rates.  Editing, therefore, allow sustained response to rapid stimuli. A crosstalk between editing and splicing is likely to occur here. Editing takes place before splicing. All AMPA receptors occur in flip and flop alternatively spliced variants. AMPA receptors that occur in the Flop form desenstise faster than the flip form. Editing is also thought to affect splicing at this site.

See also
 AMPA receptor

References

Further reading

External links 
 
 
 http://darned.ucc.ie
 

Ionotropic glutamate receptors